Hair v Gillman (2000) 80 P&CR 108 is an English land law case, concerning creation of easements.

Facts
Ms Gillman had taken a seven-year lease of a school built in the back yard of a three-storey building that had a forecourt by the street. It was leased by a third party. The school's lease (and underlying freehold) had a right of way by the building in front of it, but no express right of way over the forecourt in front of that. The building was leased to accountants for 21 years from 1977, and the freehold was bought by Mr Hair in 1985. Gillman claimed that she had been given permission to park her car in the forecourt, and this crystallised into an easement under Law of Property Act 1925, section 62(1) when acting for the school she entered into the lease. Hair before the action denied Gillman the parking space he had earlier allowed on unstated terms. He sought a declaration Gillman would have no such continuing right related to her school.

Judgment
Judge LJ sitting alone in the High Court held the permission was capable of being an easement, but Law of Property Act 1925, section 62(1) did not apply because here the use was "never intended to be on a permanent basis". Gillman appealed.

Held: that the right, even though precarious, was capable of falling under Law of Property Act 1925, section 62(1): Wright v Macadam [1949] 2 KB 744. The forecourt use was not temporary as it was not to end at a certain date. It was not secure either, and could have been withdrawn at any time, but it was nevertheless protected now.

See also

English trusts law
English property law

References

English land case law
2000 in British law
2000 in case law
Court of Appeal (England and Wales) cases